Jonathan Sogbie (born 1 February 1970) is a Liberian politician and former professional footballer who played as a forward. At club level Sogbie played for ASEC Mimosas, Lausanne-Sport, Servette, Connecticut Wolves, Rhode Island Stingrays, and Chongqing Lifan. Sogbie also played for the Liberia national team between 1990 and 1998. After his retirement from soccer, he entered politics, and is noted for being an opponent of his former teammate George Weah, who is now the President of Liberia. He previously served as the public relations manager at the National Oil Company of Liberia.

In December 2020, he was elected as a member of The Senate of Liberia, the upper house of the  bicameral legislative branch of Liberia, representing River Gee County.

References

External links
 
 

1970 births
Living people
Liberian footballers
Association football forwards
Liberia international footballers
ASEC Mimosas players
FC Lausanne-Sport players
Servette FC players
Connecticut Wolves players
Rhode Island Stingrays players
Chongqing Liangjiang Athletic F.C. players
Place of birth missing (living people)
Liberian expatriate footballers
Liberian expatriate sportspeople in Ivory Coast
Expatriate footballers in Ivory Coast
Liberian expatriate sportspeople in Switzerland
Expatriate footballers in Switzerland
Liberian expatriate sportspeople in the United States
Expatriate soccer players in the United States
Liberian expatriate sportspeople in China
Expatriate footballers in China